Meštrović or Mestrovic (also Mestrovich, Meshtrovich) is a Croatian surname. Notable people with the surname include:

Carolina Mestrovic (born 1991), Chilean singer, actress and television presenter
Ivan Meštrović (1883–1962), Croatian sculptor
Ivan Meštrović (sportsman) (born 1979), Croatian entrepreneur and sportsman
James I. Mestrovitch (1894–1918), Montenegrin-American soldier, recipient of the Medal of Honor
Mate Meštrović (born 1930), Croatian-American journalist and academic
Stelvio Mestrovich (born 1948), Italian-Croatian writer, musicologist
Stjepan Meštrović (born 1955), Croatian-American sociologist

Croatian surnames